Henry North (21 September 1883 – 8 June 1952) was a New Zealand cricketer. He played in three first-class matches for Canterbury in 1917/18.

See also
 List of Canterbury representative cricketers

References

External links
 

1883 births
1952 deaths
New Zealand cricketers
Canterbury cricketers
Cricketers from Dunedin